The UCC Philosophical Society, commonly known as the Philosoph, is the largest debating society at University College Cork, Ireland. The Philosoph was founded in 1850, making it the oldest society at UCC. The society carries out a number of functions, including weekly debates with guest speakers, participating in debating competitions, running workshops for the students of UCC to develop their public speaking skills and running debating competitions and workshops for schoolchildren (including the Denny Schools Debating Competition). In the 1960s Seán MacBride SC and Nobel Peace Prize winner called the Philosoph "the centre of independent thought in Ireland" when discussing the state of the nation.

In 1986, two Philosoph members won the World University Debating Championship at Fordham University.

House meetings of the society are held every Monday evening during UCC's term time.

Former members 
The list of former Auditors includes Sean O Riada and Eoin "The Pope" O' Mahony. Former Presidents include Charles Haughey. Other members include Prof. Donnchadh Ó Corráin of UCC, and Prof. Kieran Healy of the University of Arizona. Journalist Brendan O' Connor was a former Recording Secretary.

Competitions
The society runs several internal debating competitions each year. These include the 'George Boole Internal Maiden Speaker's Competition' (an event for first-time speakers), the 'Lord Mayor's Gold Medal' (and individual competition), and the 'Philosoph Mace' (a team competition).

In addition, the Society funds speakers in competitions throughout Ireland and internationally.  A number of Intervarsity competitions are hosted throughout Ireland and the UK which the society participates in such as the UCD Vice-President's Cup, the Oxford Union and Cambridge Union Intervarsities and the National Law Debates in Galway.  The Society also enters the John Smith Memorial Mace and the Irish Times competition.

Internationally, the society participates in the World Universities Debating Competition and the European Universities Debating Competition, and has had some success in international debating. For example, a team reached the EUDC Semi-Finals and two teams reached the World University Debating Championship Quarter-Finals in the past.

As well as participating in competitions, the Society also hosts competitions.  It became the first Irish Society to host the European Universities Debating Championships in 2005.  It has also held the World University Debating Championships in 1996 and the John Smith Memorial Mace Final in 2003.

The Philosoph hosted the 2009 World University Debating Championship in partnership with The UCC Law Society. Additionally, the society hosts its own Inter-Varsity each December. It dates back to the Mercier Cup of the 1970s whose winners include Charles Kennedy.

The Philosoph also hosts the Cork Invitational Intervarsity (IV), which hosted 80 teams in 2014.

See also 
 College Historical Society (Trinity College, Dublin)
 University Philosophical Society (Trinity College, Dublin)
 Literary and Historical Society, University College Dublin
 Literary and Debating Society (NUI Galway)
 Maynooth University Literary & Debating Society
 Law Society, University College Dublin

References

External links
 UCC Philosophical Society

Student debating societies
University College Cork